AH Scorpii (abbreviated to AH Sco) is a red supergiant variable star located in the constellation Scorpius. It is one of the largest stars known by radius and is also one of the most luminous red supergiant stars in the Milky Way.

Distance
The distance of AH Scorpii is considered to be uncertain. VLBI measurements of the masers have provided an accurate distance of  based on observation of SiO, H2O, and OH masers in its oxygen-rich circumstellar material.  The masers were observed to be approaching the star at 13 km/s, indicating overall contraction at around phase 0.55 of the visual variations.

Characteristics

AH Scorpii is a dust-enshrouded red supergiant and is classified as a semiregular variable star with a main period of 714 days. The total visual magnitude range is 6.5 - 9.6. No long secondary periods have been detected.

See also 
VY Canis Majoris
NML Cygni
Stephenson 2-18 
UY Scuti

References

Semiregular variable stars
Scorpius (constellation)
Scorpii, AH
M-type supergiants
084071
155161
J17111702-3219308
CD-32 12429
TIC objects